Henry Herbert Bowden (31 March 1888 – 3 June 1978) was an Australian rules footballer who played for University in the Victorian Football League (VFL).

References

External links

1888 births
University Football Club players
Australian rules footballers from Victoria (Australia)
People educated at Scotch College, Melbourne
Australian military personnel of World War I
1978 deaths